Srta may refer to:
Southeastern Regional Transit Authority
State Road and Tollway Authority, a government agency of the U.S. state of Georgia
Sortase A, an enzyme